This is a list of episodes for the Japanese anime series Nanatsuiro Drops. The anime was produced by Studio Barcelona, and aired in Japan on Chiba TV between July 3, 2007 and September 30, 2007, containing twelve episodes.

Episodes

Broadcasting stations

References

External links 
 Official anime website 

Nanatsuiro Drops
2007 Japanese television series debuts
2007 Japanese television series endings